Tephritis praecox is a species is a species of fly in the family Tephritidae found across Europe.

Description
The adult fly is grey-brown in colour with a wing length measuring between 1.8–3.2 mm. The wings are hyaline and distinctively marked between different species of this genus.

Biology
T. praecox is associated with several host plants including Calendula arvensis, Chrysanthemum sp., Filago gallica, and Senecio. When mating, male flies wait near the capitulum of their chosen flower bud. When a female appears they begin a mating dance during which the male holds his wings flat and then opens them alternately. The larvae develops in the seed head.

Distribution
T. praecox can be found across central and western Europe. It was first noted from Britain in 1937 on the basis of a single female found in Suffolk in 1907.

References

Tephritinae
Diptera of Europe
Insects described in 1844
Taxa named by Hermann Loew